Millman Island is an island in the Huron River, near Lake Erie, in Wayne County, Michigan. It is shown (unlabeled, as a peninsula) on an 1818 survey map, and labeled "Millman Island" on a 1936 map.

References

Islands of Wayne County, Michigan